The 2017 FIBA 3x3 World Cup, hosted by France, was an international 3x3 basketball event that featured separate competitions for men's and women's national teams. The tournament ran between 17 and 21 June 2017, in Nantes. It was co-organized by FIBA.

Matches took place outdoors at the Parc des Chantiers de I'lle nearby the Grand Éléphant and l'Arbre à Basket.

Medalists

Participating teams
The FIBA 3x3 Federation Ranking was used as basis to determine the participating FIBA member associations.

Men

Women

References

External links
Official website

 
2017
2017 in 3x3 basketball
Sport in Nantes
International basketball competitions hosted by France
2017 in French sport
June 2017 sports events in Europe